Kozma Minin was a Russian pre-revolution newspaper which had a literary-political character, the newspaper of Nizhny Novgorod governorate of the Union of the Russian People. It agitated against liberal ideology and revolutionaries. The newspaper received notoriety as for its antisemitism. It was printed twice a week from 1909 to 1917.

Editors:

 V. I. Kiselyov,
 G. R. Vasiljev.

Literature 

 Козьма Минин [Нижний Новгород, 1909—1917] // Русская периодическая печать (1895 — октябрь 1917): Справочник. — М.: Гос. изд-во полит. лит., 1957. — С. 173.
 «Козьма Минин» // Святая Русь. Энциклопедия Русского Народа. Русский патриотизм. Гл. ред., сост. О. А. Платонов, сост. А. Д. Степанов. — М.: 2003

Newspapers published in the Russian Empire
Publications established in 1909
Publications disestablished in 1917
1910s in the Russian Empire
Culture in Nizhny Novgorod
History of Nizhny Novgorod